Joachim Camerarius (12 April 150017 April 1574), the Elder, was a German classical scholar.

Life
He was born in Bamberg, in the Prince-Bishopric of Bamberg. His family name was Liebhard, but he was generally called Kammermeister, previous members of his family having held the office of chamberlain to the bishops of Bamberg.

He studied at Leipzig, Erfurt and Wittenberg, where he became intimate with Philipp Melanchthon. For some years he was teacher of history and Greek at the gymnasium in Nuremberg (Ägidiengymnasium). In 1530 he was sent as deputy for Nuremberg to the diet of Augsburg, where he helped Melanchthon in drawing up the Augsburg Confession.

Five years later he was commissioned by Duke Ulrich of Württemberg to reorganize the University of Tübingen; and in 1541 he rendered a similar service at Leipzig, where the remainder of his life was chiefly spent. He played an important part in the Reformation movement, and his advice was frequently sought by leading men.

In 1535 he entered into a correspondence with Francis I as to the possibility of a reconciliation between the Catholic and Protestant creeds; and in 1568 Maximilian II sent for him to Vienna to consult him on the same subject. He died in Leipzig on 17 April 1574. He was the father of the physician Joachim Camerarius the Younger.

Camerarius' grandson Ludwig Camerarius was a leading figure of the Thirty Years' War, as head of the Palatinate government in exile.

Works
He translated into Latin Herodotus, Demosthenes, Xenophon, Homer, Theocritus, Sophocles, Lucian, Theodoretus, Nicephorus, Ptolemy and other Greek writers. He published upwards of 150 works, including a Catalogue of the Bishops of the Principal Sees; Greek Epistles; Accounts of his Journeys, in Latin verse; a Commentary on Plautus; a treatise on numismatics; Euclid in Latin; a book of horsemanship, Hippocomicus; and the Lives of Helius Eobanus Hessus, George of Anhalt and Philipp Melanchthon. His Epistolae Familiares (published after his death) are a valuable contribution to the history of his time.

He produced the first printed Greek edition of Ptolemy's astrology text, the Tetrabiblos, in 1535. It was printed in a quarto format by the publisher Johannes Petreius at Nuremberg along with Camerarius's translation to Latin of Books I, II and portions of Books III and IV, accompanied with his notes on the first two books, the Greek text of the Centiloquium (Καρπός) and a Latin translation from Iovianus Pontanus.

An avid believer in astrology, he followed it with a second edition of the Tetrabiblos in Greek in 1553, with an accompanying Latin translation by Philipp Melanchthon and the Centiloquium (Καρπός) in Latin and Greek. This was printed in Basel, Switzerland in octavo format by Johannes Oporinus.

References

Bibliography
 
 A. Horawitz in Allgemeine deutsche Biographie. Cf. Joachim Camerarius (1500-1574). Essays on the History of Humanism during the Reformation. Munich: Fink, 1978.
 Brosseder, Claudia. (2005) "The Writing in the Wittenberg Sky: Astrology in Sixteenth-Century Germany". Journal of the History of Ideas.  Vol. 66, No. 4 (Oct.), pp. 557–576.
 Bursian, Conrad, Die Geschichte der klassischen Philologie in Deutschland (1883).
 Ptolemy, Claudius. (1971) Tetrabiblos; edited and translated into English by F.E. Robbins, Imprint London, W. Heinemann ltd., Cambridge, Massachusetts: Harvard University Press (Loeb edition).
 Sandys, John Edwin, History of Classical Scholarship (ed. 1908), ii. 266.

External links
 
Camerarius, Joachim (1605) Symbolorum & emblematum - digital facsimile from the Linda Hall Library

German classical scholars
German Renaissance humanists
German Lutherans
1500 births
1574 deaths
16th-century German writers
16th-century German male writers
Greek–Latin translators
Translators of Homer